is a train station on the Hankyu Railway Kyoto Line located in Ibaraki, Osaka Prefecture, Japan.

Lines
Hankyu Railway Kyoto Line

Layout

History 
Sojiji station opened on 15 April 1936.

Station numbering was introduced to all Hankyu stations on 21 December 2013 with this station being designated as station number HK-70.

Stations next to Sōjiji

References

External links

 Sōjiji Station from Hankyu Railway website

Ibaraki, Osaka
Hankyu Kyoto Main Line
Railway stations in Osaka Prefecture
Railway stations in Japan opened in 1936